Polyarthron is a genus of beetle in the family Cerambycidae.

Species
 Polyarthron pectinicorne (Fabricius, 1792) 
 Polyarthron philbyi Villiers, 1968

References

Prioninae